Brigadier General David A. Carrión Baralt is a former Adjutant General of the Puerto Rico National Guard during the administration of Puerto Rico Governor Aníbal Acevedo Vilá from 2004 to 2008.

Early years

David Carrión was born on September 17, 1957, in Rio Piedras, Puerto Rico. Son of David Carrión Fuentes and Maria Mercedes Soltero. After High School went to study economics at the University of Puerto Rico, Mayagüez campus and law at the Interamerican University of Puerto Rico School of Law.

Military and juridical career

Carrión Baralt, who since 2004 so far has played as officer of property and finances of the United States for Puerto Rico in the National Guard, earned his degree of Juris Doctor from the Faculty of law of the Interamerican University. Similarly, he holds a Masters in strategic planning from the United States Army War College at Carlisle Barracks in Carlisle, Pennsylvania, and holds a Bachelor of Arts with a concentration in economics of the University of Puerto Rico at Mayagüez. Completed the Staff Judge Advocate Course in Charlottesville, Virginia. He is admitted to legal practice in the Supreme Court of Puerto Rico, in the Court's circuit of appeals from the United States, for the first circuit and the District Court of the United States for the District of Puerto Rico. He also served as a legal military adviser during the weekends in the NG, from 1999 to 2004, where he provided legal assistance in military affairs and oversaw the performance of all consultants of the GN judges. Specifically, from 1987 to 1999 he worked as military legal adviser in time complete, position which was dedicated to reviewing administrative investigations, representing the National Guard to federal agencies, administrative and courts before the boards of the Government of Puerto Rico. At the same time, was the link between the NG and the Department of Justice of the United States. In its practice of lawyer, he was in areas of civil law, tax law and notarial law. As part of its contribution to the public service, Carrión Baralt also worked as a lawyer in the Department of Justice from 1985 to 1986, in the litigation Division. Their goals include improving the effectiveness and efficiency of the National Guard, including better use of its facilities such as the armories of the island and exploitation of the resources of the trust for the Puerto Rico National Guard.

June 1979 - May 1980, Personnel Administrative Officer, Headquarters & Headquarters Detachment, Puerto Rio National Guard, Puerto Rico
May 1980 - July 1980, Student, Adjutant General Officer Basic, United States of America Institute of Administration, Fort Benjamin Harrison, Indiana
July 1980 - March 1983, Personnel Administrative Officer, Headquarters & Headquarters Detachment, Puerto Rico Army National Guard, San Juan, Puerto Rico 
April 1983 - September 1984, Executive Officer, Headquarters, State Area Command, Puerto Rico Army National Guard, San Juan, Puerto Rico
September 1984 - March 1985, Student, Adjutant General Advance Officer Basic, United States of America Institute of Administration, Fort Benjamin Harrison, Indiana. 
March 1985 - January 1986, Executive Officer, Headquarters, State Area Command, Puerto Rico Army National Guard, San Juan, Puerto Rico 
February 1986 - April 1986, Detachment Commander, Headquarters, State Area Command, Puerto Rico Army National Guard, San Juan, Puerto Rico
May 1986 - June 1986, Executive Officer, Headquarters, State Area Command, Puerto Rico Army National Guard, San Juan, Puerto Rico
July 1986 - September 1987, Aide-de-Camp, Headquarters, State Area Command, Puerto Rico Army National Guard, San Juan, Puerto Rico
September 1987 - November 1987, Recruiting & Induction Officer, Headquarters, State Area Command, Puerto Rico Army National Guard, San Juan, Puerto Rico
December 1987 - January 1989, Retention Officer, Headquarters, State Area Command, Puerto Rico Army National Guard, San Juan, Puerto Rico
January 1989 -September 1990, Judge Advocate General, Headquarters, State Area Command, Puerto Rico Army National Guard, San Juan, Puerto Rico
September 1990 - October 1999, Judge Advocate General, Headquarters, State Area Command, Puerto Rico Army National Guard, San Juan, Puerto Rico
November 1999 - November 2004, Staff Judge Advocate, Headquarters, State Area Command, Puerto Rico Army National Guard, San Juan, Puerto Rico
November 2004 - December 2006, United States Property & Fiscal Officer, Puerto Rico Army National Guard, Joint Element Joint Forces -Headquarters, San Juan, Puerto Rico
January 2007 - January 2011, The Adjutant General, Puerto Rico National Guard, Joint Element Joint Forces - Headquarters, San Juan, Puerto Rico

Military awards and decorations

Effective Dates of Promotions

See also

List of Puerto Rican military personnel
Puerto Rico Adjutant General

References
 
 https://web.archive.org/web/20101123000912/http://www.jtfgtmo.southcom.mil/storyarchive/2007/November/112207-1-prtag.html

1957 births
Interamerican University of Puerto Rico alumni
Living people
People from Río Piedras, Puerto Rico
Puerto Rican military officers
United States Army War College alumni
Puerto Rico Adjutant Generals
Recipients of the Humanitarian Service Medal
Recipients of the Meritorious Service Medal (United States)
United States Army generals
National Guard (United States) generals
Puerto Rico National Guard personnel